Breno may refer to:

People
 Breno Borges, Brazilian football player
 Breno Cezar (born 1995), Brazilian football player
 Breno Coelho, Brazilian photographer/cinematographer
 Breno Correia (born 1999), Brazilian swimmer
 Breno Giacomini (born 1985), American American football player
 Breno Lopes (footballer, born 1990), Brazilian football leftback
 Breno Lopes (footballer, born 1996), Brazilian football forward
 Breno Lorran, Brazilian football player
 Breno Matosinhos (born 1991), Brazilian football player
 Breno Mello (1931–2008), Brazilian athlete and actor
 Breno Silva (born 1986), Brazilian football player
 Breno Alencar Bianco, pen name of Júlio César de Mello e Souza (1895-1974), Brazilian writer and mathematics professor
 Phil Breno (born 1995), American football player
 Breno (footballer, born 2000), Brazilian footballer

Places
 Breno, Lombardy, Italy
 Breno, Ticino, Switzerland

See also
Brno, Czech Republic